Louise van den Plas (24 January 1877 – 4 December 1968) was a Belgian suffragist and the founder of the first Christian feminist movement in Belgium.

Biography
Louise van den Plas was born in Brussels, Belgium, on 24 January 1877.

In March 1899 in Brussels, she met Marie Duclos, founder, with Marie Maugeret of the French Catholic feminist association "Christian Feminism". Van den Plas went to Paris to study this movement and then, on the advice of Duclos, she made contact in Brussels with Belgian journalist Rene Henry and a friend of the latter, a member of the Chamber. The latter were all the more interested in the situation of women as Belgium was moving towards universal suffrage and the enlargement of the electorate could benefit the socialists. The latter intended to vote in favor of women's suffrage, but there were fears associated with that.

In May 1902, feminist groups with varied political views created a Feminist Union to weigh in favor of women's suffrage. Van den Plas took this opportunity to represent the Catholic group. "Le Féminisme chrétien de Belgique" (Belgian Christian Feminism) was founded on 6 May 1902. It aimed to improve women's rights and promote feminism among Catholics while respecting the Catholic constitution of the family. It issued a monthly organ, Christian Feminism of Belgium, and provided lectures.

With other feminist organizations, Christian Feminism gave the opportunity for women to enter into family councils and guardianship management, as well as advocating the full civil capacity of women who had obtained legal separation. Through its efforts alone, a woman's testimony was accepted to the acts of civil status (1908).

Van den Plas won the sympathy of some of the Catholic newspapers and the Belgian Democratic League for the suffrage of women. She said that women would take a special look at issues of public morality, alcoholism, and school. On 3 March 1912, Christian Feminism founded the Catholic League of Women's Suffrage, with the assistance of Cyrille van Overbergh. The League initiated an important petition in January 1913, signed by Van den Plas. Several feminist groups followed suit and together, they created the Suffrage Federation in the following month.

During the World War I, the publication of Christian Feminism's magazine was suspended and Van den Plas founded "Union patriotique des femmes belges" (Patriotic Union of Belgian Women) with Jane Brigode and Marguerite Nyssens, which provided for material aid to women. At the end of the war, the magazine reappeared and Van den Plas was offered a free platform in the daily Le Soir from 1921 to 1940. She died in Willaupuis, Belgium, on 4 December 1968.

Works
 Féminisme, 1899
 Pourquoi les chrétiens doivent être féministes, 1904
 Le Féminisme chrétien de Belgique, 1905-1940
 Revision du code civil la séparation de biens avec communauté d'acquêts substituée al communauté légale comme Droit commun en l'absence de Contrat de mariage, 1908
 Etude sur la revision du titre du contrat de mariage, 1909
 L'éducatioin ménagère, 1909
 Een katholieke vrouw over het vrouwenkiesrecht, 1911
 Le suffrage féminin : Discours prononcé à l'Assemblée générale du Féminisme Chrétien de Belgique : Suppl. au Féminisme Chrétien, mars 1912 , 1912
 Féminisme et catholicisme, 1912
 Le suffrage des femmes : discours prononcé au Congrès de la Ligue démocratique, à Courtrai, le 25 septembre 1911, 1913
 Le féminisme chrétien, 1913
 L'union pratriotique des femmes belges, 1915
 Féminisme maternel, 1920
 Quelques souvenirs de vingt ans d'efforts, 1922
 Le féminisme chrètien (Second Edition), 1925
 Ou en est le féminisme en Belgique?, 1931
 La lutte contre l'alcoolisme ses ravages en Belgique spécialement du point de vue familial, des moyens en le vaincre, 1944
 Rapport d'activité présenté à l'Assemblée générale, 1952
 Une grave responsabilité des élites, 1953

Notes

References

Further reading
 Boel M. & Duchene C., Le féminisme en Belgique, 1892-1914, Bruxelles, 1955.
 Camille Joset, Le bon féminisme, Arlon, Éditions de l'Avenir du Luxembourg, 1904.
 Keymolen Denise, Victoire Cappe. 1886-1927 : une vie chrétienne, sociale, féministe, Presses universitaires de Louvain : Bruylant-Academia, 2001
 Keymolen Denise, van den Plas, Louise, Marie, Joséphine, Nouvelle biographie nationale, 1,1988, pp. 339–343.
 Keymolen Denise e.a., Pas à pas: L'histoire de l'émancipation de la femme en Belgique, Service d'État à l'émancipation sociale, Bruxelles, 1991
 Keymolen Denise, van den Plas, Louise, Marie, Joséphine, in Eliane Gubin, Catherine Jacques, Valérie Piette, Jean Puissant (dir.), Dictionnaire des femmes belges, XIX°-XX° s., Bruxelles : Racine, 2006, p. 544–547.  
 Peeters Denise, Féminisme chrétien. Les femmes dans l'Église catholique en Belgique, in L. Courtois e.a., Femmes des années 1980, Un siècle de condition féminine en Belgique 1898–1989, Louvain-la-Neuve, 1989, pp. 221–228.
Van Rokeghem Suzanne, Des femmes dans l'histoire en Belgique, depuis 1830, Éditions Luc Pire, Bruxelles, 2006, p.83.
 Verschoren M., Louise van den Plas (1877-1968) en haar christelijk-feministisch engagement voor 1914, Mémoire de licence, Louvain, 1996.
 Zelis G. & Stessel M., Le travail de la femme mariée en Belgique durant l'entre deux-guerres : travail salarié ou travail ménager ? Le discours des organisations chrétiennes, in L. Courtois e.a., Femmes des années 1980, Un siècle de condition féminine en Belgique 1889–1989, Louvain-la-Neuve, 1989, pp. 63-72

1877 births
1968 deaths
Proponents of Christian feminism
Belgian feminists
Belgian suffragists
19th-century Belgian writers
19th-century Belgian women writers
20th-century Belgian writers
20th-century Belgian women writers
Belgian non-fiction writers
Activists from Brussels
Belgian women activists
Catholic feminists
Writers from Brussels